The Golden Gate Railroad Museum  is a non-profit railroad museum in California that is dedicated to the preservation of steam and passenger railroad equipment, as well as the interpretation of local railroad history.

History
The Golden Gate Railroad Museum (GGRM) traces its origins to 1972, when Mike Mangini first spotted ex-SP 2472, a steam locomotive that had been on static display in the San Mateo County Fairgrounds parking lot since 1959. In 1975, Mangini was granted permission to take the locomotive away, and weekend volunteers began restoring 2472 on weekends, shortly thereafter incorporating as Project 2472. After the boiler was restored, the locomotive was moved in 1990 to San Francisco at the Hunters Point Shipyard. On April 30, 1991, 2472 moved under its own power to Santa Clara and then Sacramento for display at Railfair '91.

The museum was initially located in Hunters Point until the Navy notified GGRM in August 2005 that all leases would be cancelled and the area would need to be vacated by February 2006, as it was turning the site over to the city. The museum moved its collection of 12 locomotives and over 25 pieces of rolling stock to Sunol, California, home of the Niles Canyon Railway operated by the Pacific Locomotive Association (PLA); some of the collection was sold or donated to other historical rail sites, including the Western Pacific Railroad Museum (WPRM), operated by the Feather River Rail Society (FRRS). FRRS and PLA participated in the GGRM's big move, with FRRS loaning road-worthy engines and crews to facilitate the move. In exchange, GGRM donated several locomotives and cars to WPRM.

In January 2017, GGRM announced it would be moving to Schellville, California, on the Northwestern Pacific Railroad. The GGRM's new Schellville yard, near Victory Station, was fenced in late 2018, and the move to Schellville commenced in March 2020. Preparations to move the fleet included replacing obsolete brake valves on passenger cars, fixing air leaks, and replacing wheel sets.

The offices of GGRM are in Redwood City. The museum performs restoration work on its collection, which it showcases for special events.

Collection
The collection of the GGRM is centered around the equipment used by Southern Pacific for its Peninsula Commute operation along the San Francisco Peninsula between San Francisco and San Jose.

In popular culture
In the 2003 season of the television show MythBusters, the episode "Peeing on the Third Rail" was filmed at the original location in Hunters Point.

See also 

 List of heritage railroads in the United States
 List of museums in California

References

External links
Home page

Museums in Alameda County, California
History of San Francisco
Railroad museums in California
Museums established in 1975